This is a list of the Northern Ireland national football team results from 2020 to the present day.

2020s

2020

2021

2022

2023

Notes

References

External links
RSSSF: (Northern) Ireland - International Results
Northern Ireland Football Greats Archive
Northern Ireland Statistics and Records

2020-present
results
2021–22 in Northern Ireland association football
2022–23 in Northern Ireland association football